Ellen Jokikunnas (b. 18 November 1976) is a Finnish model, PR manager, and television presenter. She is best known for hosting all four seasons of Idols, but her first fame came from competing in the Miss Finland pageant in 1998. Besides Idols, she has hosted the children's quiz show Suuri kupla ("Big Bubble"), as well as her own traveling show, Ellen Express.

Jokikunnas was born in Janakkala, and has three brothers and sisters: Emil, Anton and Ida. She has lived in Turku, but moved later to Helsinki, and has recently bought an old railway station from Röykkä, Nurmijärvi, which she is renovating as her new home. The renovation is documented on TV on Joka kodin asuntomarkkinat. She is also known as an active traveler, who survived the 2004 Indian Ocean earthquake in Sri Lanka.

Jokikunnas experienced some questionable publicity when her insinuations about Pamela Anderson's breasts and hepatitis C while hosting Raumanmeren juhannus ("The Midsummer Festivals of Rauma") in 2007 – where Anderson was a VIP performer – caused a stir in Finnish tabloids.

Career in television 
 Suuri kupla
 Ellen Express
 Idols (Finland)
 V.I.P. Seikkailu
 Eurovision Song Contest 2007, Finnish commentator
 Mental Samurai Suomi

References

External links

Idols (Finnish TV series)
1976 births
Living people
People from Janakkala
Finnish female models
Finnish television presenters
Finnish women television presenters